Maidstone and The Weald is a constituency in Kent represented in the House of Commons of the UK Parliament since 2010 by Helen Grant of the Conservative Party. She succeeded fellow party member Ann Widdecombe, who had held the seat since it was created for the 1997 general election.

Boundaries
1997–2010: The Borough of Maidstone wards of Allington, Barming, Boughton Monchelsea, Bridge, Coxheath, East, Farleigh, Heath, High Street, Loose, Marden, North, South, Staplehurst, Yalding; and the Borough of Tunbridge Wells wards of Benenden, Cranbrook, Frittenden and Sissinghurst, Hawkhurst, Sandhurst.

2010–present: The Borough of Maidstone wards of Allington, Barming, Bridge, Coxheath and Hunton, East, Fant, Heath, High Street, Loose, Marden and Yalding, North, South, Staplehurst; and the Borough of Tunbridge Wells wards of Benenden and Cranbrook, Frittenden and Sissinghurst.

The largest settlement is the central county town of Maidstone in Kent in southeast England with smaller settlements spread throughout agriculture-rich Maidstone borough and partly wooded Tunbridge Wells borough.

History
The constituency was created for the 1997 general election, after the previous Maidstone constituency was split in two: its southeast wards of Shepway and Park Wood of the town itself and the rural wards east of the town joined Faversham in the new Faversham and Mid Kent constituency. The remaining two-thirds of the electorate in west-central Maidstone were reunited with the town wards that had been lost in 1983 to Mid Kent (which was abolished), as well as joined by a rural part of the Weald to the south of the town, previously in the Tunbridge Wells constituency.

History of members
The Member of Parliament (MP) for the seat from its creation in 1997 was Ann Widdecombe of the Conservative Party. Widdecombe was the MP for the former seat of Maidstone (1987–1997); she served as a Home Office Minister of State in the government of John Major from 1995 to 1997 and later as Shadow Home Secretary from 1999 to 2001. She stood down at the 2010 general election and was succeeded by Helen Grant, also a member of the Conservative Party.

Constituency profile
Most of the electorate live in urban Maidstone, which has some light industry but whose economy is increasingly dominated by the service sector (including care, hospitality and insurance). The south of the constituency is rural with significant orchards and market gardens. Many residents commute daily to London. To summarise this is an urban-rural seat in a prosperous part of Kent.

Members of Parliament

Elections

Elections in the 2010s

Elections in the 2000s

Elections in the 1990s

Notes

References

Sources
 T. H. B. Oldfield, The Representative History of Great Britain and Ireland (London: Baldwin, Cradock & Joy, 1816)
 Robert Waller, The Almanac of British Politics (1st edition, London: Croom Helm, 1983; 5th edition, London: Routledge, 1996)
 Frederic A Youngs, jr, "Guide to the Local Administrative Units of England, Vol I" (London: Royal Historical Society, 1979)

See also
List of parliamentary constituencies in Kent

Constituencies of the Parliament of the United Kingdom established in 1997
Parliamentary constituencies in Kent
Borough of Maidstone
Politics of the Borough of Tunbridge Wells